Elisabeth Epps is an American activist and politician serving as a member of the Colorado House of Representatives for the 6th district. Elected in November 2022, she assumed office on January 9, 2023.

Early life and education 
Epps was born in Winston-Salem, North Carolina. She earned a Juris Doctor from the University of Virginia School of Law.

Career 
Epps is the founder of the Colorado Freedom Fund, a non-profit bail fund organization that provides financial support to individuals who are unable to post bail. She was elected to the Colorado House of Representatives in November 2022 and assumed office on January 9, 2023. 

She is a member of the Democratic Socialists of America.

References 

Living people
Colorado Democrats
Democratic Socialists of America politicians from Colorado
Members of the Colorado House of Representatives
Women state legislators in Colorado
University of Virginia School of Law alumni
Politicians from Denver
Activists from Colorado
People from Winston-Salem, North Carolina
African-American state legislators in Colorado
Year of birth missing (living people)